The New River is a  tributary of the Withlacoochee River in the U.S. state of Georgia.  Via the Withlacoochee and Suwannee rivers, its waters flow to the Gulf of Mexico.

The New River rises in the northern outskirts of Tifton, Georgia, and flows southeast to join the Withlacoochee between the cities of Adel and Nashville.  For the lower 2/3 of its course, it forms the boundary between Berrien and Cook counties.

See also
List of rivers of Georgia

References 

USGS Hydrologic Unit Map - State of Georgia (1974)

Rivers of Georgia (U.S. state)
Rivers of Berrien County, Georgia
Rivers of Cook County, Georgia
Rivers of Tift County, Georgia